Kokumintō (lit. National Party) may refer to:
National Party (Japan), a defunct political party whose Japanese name was Kokumintō
Rikken Kokumintō, a defunct political party in Japan also known as Kokumintō